Żychliński is a Polish surname. Notable people with the surname include:

Ludwik Żychliński (1837–?), Polish activist
Rajzel Żychlińsky (1910–2001), Polish-American poet
Teodor Żychliński (1830–1909), Polish historian, diarist and journalist

Polish-language surnames